The 1990 South Dakota gubernatorial election took place on November 6, 1990, to elect a Governor of South Dakota. Republican Governor George S. Mickelson was re-elected, defeating Democratic nominee Bob L. Samuelson. , this was the last time Oglala County and Todd County voted for a Republican gubernatorial candidate. Mickelson died in a plane crash near Zwingle, Iowa on April 19, 1993.

Republican primary

Candidates
George S. Mickelson, incumbent Governor of South Dakota

Democratic primary

Candidates
 Bob L. Samuelson, former state senator

General election

Results

References

1990
South Dakota
1990 South Dakota elections